Jean Perronet may refer to:
Jean-Rodolphe Perronet (1708-1794), French engineer
Jean Maurice Perronet (1877–1950), French fencer